Grozyashchy was one of 29 s (officially known as Project 7) built for the Soviet Navy during the late 1930s. Completed in 1939, she was assigned to the Baltic Fleet and played a minor role in the Winter War of 1939–1940 against the Finns. After the start of the German invasion of the Soviet Union (Operation Barbarossa) in June 1941, Grozyashchy participated in the Gulf of Riga Campaign and laid minefields in the Gulf of Finland. She was badly damaged by a mine in July and was under repair for over a month. The ship was crippled by German bombs in late September and did not become operational for almost a year. Grozyashchy provided naval gunfire support in 1944 for the Leningrad–Novgorod Offensive.

The ship was scheduled to be modernized in 1952, but it had to be cancelled the following year as her poor condition made it uneconomical and she was later scrapped.

Design and description
Having decided to build the large and expensive   destroyer leaders, the Soviet Navy sought Italian assistance in designing smaller and cheaper destroyers.

Their crew numbered 197 officers and sailors in peacetime and 236 in wartime. The designers had been conservative in rating the turbines and many, but not all, of the ships handily exceeded their designed speed during their sea trials. Others fell considerably short of it. Grozyashchy reached  from  during trials in 1944.

As built, the Gnevny-class ships mounted four  B-13 guns in two pairs of superfiring single mounts fore and aft of the superstructure. Anti-aircraft defense was provided by a pair of  34-K AA guns in single mounts and a pair of  21-K AA guns as well as two  DK or DShK machine guns. They carried six  torpedo tubes in two rotating triple mounts; each tube was provided with a reload. The ships could also carry a maximum of either 60 or 95 mines and 25 depth charges. The ships were equipped with two K-1 paravanes intended to destroy mines and a pair of depth-charge throwers.

Modifications
While under repair in July–September 1941, Grozyashchy received a pair of BMB-1 depth-charge throwers and a degaussing coil. By 1943 the destroyer's anti-aircraft armament consisted of three 34-K mounts, four  70-K AA guns in single mounts, two twin-gun mounts for Lend-Lease, water-cooled 12.7 mm Colt-Browning machine guns and two single mounts for DK machine guns. Two additional 70-K guns were received in 1944. By the end of the war, she had received a British ASDIC system and an early-warning radar of unknown type. After the war, all of her AA guns were replaced by eight water-cooled V-11M versions of the 70-K gun in twin mounts.

Construction and service 
Grozyashchy was built in Leningrad's Shipyard No. 190 (Zhdanov) as yard number 513 where the ship was laid down on 18 June 1936 and launched on 5 January 1937. After she was launched, she was towed across the River Neva to be finished by Shipyard No. 189 (Ordzhonikidze) where she was given yard number 301, and was completed on 17 September 1939. Assigned to the Baltic Fleet, she bombarded Finnish fortifications on Utö in Åland on 14 December 1939 during the Winter War together with her sister ship  Grozyashchy also captured the Finnish merchant ship  during the war.

When Operation Barbarossa, the German invasion of the Soviet Union, began on 22 June 1941, the destroyer was based in Ust-Dvinsk, Latvia, as part of the 1st Destroyer Division of the fleet's Light Forces Detachment. She participated in the defense of the Gulf of Riga, laying minefields in the Irben Straits during the nights of 24/25 and 26/27 June. The ship sailed to Kuivastu, Estonia, on the 27th and then helped to escort Kirov through the Moonsund archipelago to Tallinn, Estonia, three days later as the Soviets evacuated their forces from the Gulf of Riga. Grozyashchy participated in an unsuccessful attack on a group of German landing craft off the mouth of the Daugava River on 13 July. After laying a minefield in the Gulf of Finland on 21 July, a mine detonated in one of her paravanes. The explosion flooded part of her double bottom, the fire-control compartment and the forward boiler room. With a badly damaged forward hull, Grozyashchy was forced to steam in reverse for Tallinn. After temporary repairs, she steamed to Kronstadt on 24 July for repairs that lasted until 2 September.

On 9 September the ship fired 86 rounds from her 130 mm guns in support of the defenders of the Oranienbaum Bridgehead. On 10 and 12 September, Grozyashchy laid 54 mines and 90 mine defenders in Luga Bay and nearby areas. On the latter day, her propellers were damaged after they struck a reef and had to go to Kronstadt for repairs. On 22–23 September the ship was hit three times by German bombs which started a large fire that had to be put out by flooding the drydock that she was in. Grozyashchy was further damaged by splinters from artillery shells detonating in the dock on 29 September. The cumulative effects knocked out her steering, put her aft-most 130 mm gun out of action and damaged much of her machinery in addition to killing seven crewmen and injuring twenty others. The ship was towed to Shipyard No. 189 for repairs on 3 October.

While still under repair, Grozyashchy was slightly damaged by shell splinters on 24 April 1942. The repairs were finally completed on 1 June, although she conducted trials at Kronstadt on 13 July. The ship returned to Leningrad on 9 November and began a refit on 22 December. During the Leningrad–Novgorod Offensive, Grozyashchy fired a total of 63 main-gun shells in support of Soviet troops on 14–18 January 1944.

After the war, the destroyer was scheduled to be modernized on 24 June 1952, but her condition was so poor that it was canceled on 24 August 1953 and she was subsequently scrapped.

Citations

Sources

Further reading
 

Gnevny-class destroyers
1937 ships
Ships built at Severnaya Verf
Ships built at the Baltic Shipyard
Cold War destroyers of the Soviet Union